Elodie Marion Razafy (born 8 September 1998) is a Malagasy swimmer. She competed in the women's 50 metre backstroke event at the 2017 World Aquatics Championships.

References

1998 births
Living people
Malagasy female swimmers
Place of birth missing (living people)
Female backstroke swimmers